Anthony Freda is an American illustrator and painter of commercial art.

Freda's paintings are an amalgamation of vintage found-objects, including scraps taken from antique rulers, aging books, bits of metal, old barn wood, and forgotten souvenirs, combined with detailed drawings and paintings that may be a mix of handwork with some computer manipulation.

His work regularly appears in Communication Arts, American Illustration, and most recently in a book titled, "The 200 Best Illustrators Worldwide," published by Luerzer's Archive.
Freda's work also featured prominently throughout well-known animal rights activist Karen Dawn's  2008 book, titled "Thanking the Monkey: Rethinking the Way We Treat Animals," published by HarperCollins.

Other recent appearances of Freda's work were in national ad campaigns by Converse, Mini Cooper, and Rockport Shoe Company. Freda served as a judge for The Society of Illustrator's annual competition held in New York City in 2006, and his work has also appeared in several volumes of the society's annual publication highlighting the best of American illustration.

In 2006 The Village Voice commissioned Freda to illustrate a story about people who challenge the official 9/11 narrative; the artwork has since become part of the permanent collection of the US National September 11 Museum and Memorial in New York, NY. An interview was conducted by the museum's curators as part of the acceptance process and the meeting was documented by filmmaker John Massaria.

Freda is a freelance contributor to The Nation and Adbusters Magazines.

In 2017, Freda's piece " Don't Tase Me, Bro." Was selected to be part of the international, juried competition, "Delusional" at Jonathan LeVine Projects in New Jersey.

Freda currently teaches illustration as an adjunct professor at Fashion Institute of Technology in New York, NY, and is curator and owner of Star Gallery NYC.

Though known primarily for his widely published political artwork, Freda is moving away from this genre to focus on teaching, curating and exploring more personal artistic endeavors.

References 

American illustrators
Year of birth missing (living people)
Living people
Pratt Institute alumni